James Polk Latta (October 31, 1844 – September 11, 1911) was a Nebraska Democratic politician.

Born near Ashland, Ohio, he moved with his parents to Jackson County, Iowa, in 1846. He attended school and worked on a farm. In 1863 he moved to the Nebraska Territory to teach school in Tekamah, Nebraska. He farmed and raised stock in Burt County, Nebraska, eventuality becoming interested in banking. He organized the First National Bank of Tekamah in 1890 and served as its president until his death.

He was elected to the Nebraska House of Representatives in 1887 and to the Nebraska Senate in 1907. He ran and won to represent as a democrat Nebraska's 3rd district to the Sixty-first and Sixty-second Congresses serving from March 4, 1909, to his death on September 11, 1911, in Rochester, Minnesota. He is buried in the Tekamah Cemetery.

See also
 List of United States Congress members who died in office (1900–49)

References
 
 
 James P. Latta, late a representative from Nebraska, Memorial addresses delivered in the House of Representatives and Senate frontispiece 1913
 
 

1844 births
1911 deaths
Democratic Party members of the Nebraska House of Representatives
Democratic Party Nebraska state senators
People from Ashland County, Ohio
Democratic Party members of the United States House of Representatives from Nebraska
19th-century American politicians
People from Tekamah, Nebraska